Chanda Sahib (died 12 June 1752) was a subject of the Mughal Empire and the Nawab of the Carnatic between 1749 and 1752. Initially he was supported by the French during the Carnatic Wars. After his defeat at Arcot in 1751, he was captured by the Marathas of Thanjavur and executed.

He was the son-in-law of the Nawab of Carnatic Dost Ali Khan, under whom he worked as a Dewan.

Chanda Sahib, an ally of the French, annexed the Madurai Nayaks and was declared the "Nawab", bringing Tanjore and Tinnevelly into the dominions of the Mughal  Empire.

He was weakened by constant Maratha attacks and was defeated by Muhammed Ali Khan Wallajah. After his forces were defeated by Robert Clive and the Maratha Empire, he attempted to recoup his losses but was beheaded in a mutiny by Hindu subjects in the Tanjore army.

Early life
His birth name was Husayn Dost Khan.

Chanda Sahib sought the investiture of the Mughal Emperor Ahmad Shah Bahadur by declaring himself "Nawab of Tinnevelly" and gathered his own army of 3500 men and even received 400 French infantry from Dupleix.

Subduing Madurai

Vijaya Ranga Chokkanatha died in 1731, and was succeeded by his widow Meenakshi, who acted as Queen-Regent on behalf of a young boy she had adopted as the heir of her dead husband. She had only ruled a year or two when an insurrection was raised against her by Vangaru Thirumala, the father of her adopted son, who pretended to have claims of his own to the throne of Madurai. At this juncture representatives of the Mughals appeared on the scene and took an important part in the struggle.

Since 1693, Madurai nominally had been the feudatory of the emperor of Delhi, and since 1698 the Carnatic region north of the Coleroon (Kollidam) river had been under direct Muslim rule. The local representative of the Mughal was the Nawab of Arcot, Dost Ali Khan and an intermediate authority was held by the Nizam of Hyderabad, who was in theory both a subordinate of the emperor, and the superior of the Nawab.

How regularly the kings of Tanjore and Madurai paid their tribute is not clear, but in 1734 — about the time, in fact, that Meenakshi and Vangaru Tirumala were fighting for the crown — an expedition was sent by the then Nawab of Arcot to exact tribute and submission from the kingdoms of the south. The leaders of this expedition were the Nawab Dost Ali khan's son, Safdar Ali Khan, and his nephew and confidential adviser, the well-known Chanda Sahib.

The invaders took Tanjore by storm and, leaving the stronghold of Trichinopoly untouched, swept across Madurai and Tinnevelly and into Travancore. On their return from this expedition they took part in the quarrel between Meenakshi and Vangaru Tirumala. The latter approached Safdar Ali Khan with an offer of 30,000 gold and silver coins if he would oust the Meenakshi in favour of himself. Unwilling to attack Trichinopoly, the Muslim prince contented himself with solemnly declaring Vangaru Tirumala to be king and took 30,000 gold and silver coins. He then marched away, leaving Chanda Sahib to enforce his award as best he could. Meenakshi, was immediately alarmed at the turn affairs now had taken, had little difficulty in persuading that facile politician to accept her tribute of 100,000 silver and gold coins and declared her duly entitled to the throne.

Meenakshi required Chanda Sahib to swear on the Quran that he would adhere faithfully to his engagement. He was honorably admitted into the Trichinopoly fort and Vangaru Tirumala — apparently with the good will of the queen, who, did not seem to have wished him any harm and allowed him to venture into Madurai, to rule over that region and Tinnevelly.

Career

Chanda Sahib accepted a large tributes for protection and departed to Arcot. Two years later 1736 he returned, again was admitted into the Trichinopoly fort, and proceeded to instate himself the Nawab of the Carnatic and received recognition by the Mughal Emperor Ahmad Shah Bahadur.

Chanda Sahib eventually marched against Vangaru Tirumala, who still was ruling in the south, defeated him at Ammaya Nayakkanur and Dindigul, drove him to take refuge in Sivaganga, and occupied the southern provinces of the Madurai Nayak.

For a time, Chanda Sahib had his own way. His success was regarded with suspicion and even hostility by the Nawab of Arcot. But family loyalties prevented a rupture and Chanda Sahib was left undisturbed, while he strengthened the fortifications of Trichinopoly and appointed his two brothers as governors of the strongholds of Dindigul and Madurai. It was at this period that he subjugated the king of Tanjore, although he did not annex his territory, and he compelled them to cede Karaikal to the French.  On 14 February 1739, Karaikal became a French colony.

Maratha interlude (1740—1743)

Unable to help themselves against the Europeans and the subjects of The Mogul, the king of Tanjore and Vangaru Tirumala called for the assistance of the Marathas of Satara in Maharashtra.

These Maratha of the Carnatic had their own grievance against the Muslims of Arcot, with whom Chanda Sahib still was identified, because of long-delayed payment of the chouth, or one-fourth of their revenues, which they had promised in return for the withdrawal of the Marathas from their country and the discontinuation of their incursions. These Marathas of Tanjore also were encouraged to attempt reprisals by the Nizam of Hyderabad, who — jealous of the increasing power of the Nawab and careless of the loyalty due to co-religionists — gladly would have seen his dangerous subordinate brought to the ground.

Early in 1740, therefore, the Marathas appeared in the south with a vast army, and defeated and killed the Nawab of Arcot (Dost Ali Khan) in the pass of Damalcheruvu, now in Chittoor district. Then they came to an understanding with his son, the Safdar Ali Khan, recognised him as Nawab, in return, Khan accepted Maratha suzerainty and undertook to pay Marathas, an indemnity of 40 lakh rupees and a regular Chauth.

With the Nawab of Arcot greatly weakened and Chanda Sahib was captured and imprisoned by the Marathas in the siege of Tiruchirappalli (1741) led by general Raghuji Bhonsle under the orders of Chhattrapati Shahu.

In 1741, the Travancore-Dutch War had broken out, during the course of the conflict it was the policy of the subjects of the  Mogul to support European mercantile presence in the Indian subcontinent.

Nawab of the Carnatic

The Second Carnatic War (1749-1754)

After the death of the Nizam of Hyderabad, a civil war for succession broke out in south between Nasir Jung and Muzaffar Jung. Also, Chanda Sahib began to conspire against the Nawab Anwaruddin Muhammed Khan in Carnatic. This led to the Second Carnatic War.

Defeat at Arcot

In 1751, there was an ongoing scuffle between Mohamed Ali Khan Walajan, (who was the son of the previous Nawab of Arcot, Anwaruddin Muhammed Khan and hence the rightful claimant) and Chanda Sahib. Dupleix sided with Chanda sahib and Muzaffar Jung to bring them into power in their respective states. But soon the English intervened. To offset the French influence, they began supporting Nasir Jung and Muhammed Ali Khan Wallajah. Chanda Sahib initially succeeded and became the Nawab, forcing Muhammed Ali Khan Wallajah to escape to the rock-fort in Tiruchirapalli.

Defeat at Trichinopoly

Chanda Sahib followed and with the help of the French, led the siege of Tiruchirappalli (1751–1752). Muhammed Ali Khan Wallajah and the English force supporting him were in a grim position. A small English force of 300 soldiers made a diversionary attack on Arcot to draw away Chanda Sahib's army from Trichy. Chanda Sahib dispatched a 10,000 strong force under his son Raza Sahib to retake Arcot. Raza Sahib was aided by the Nellore Army and Muhammed Yusuf Khan as a Subedar may have been in this force. There he was defeated by English forces, that mostly enlisted Indians.

Death

At Arcot, and later at Kaveripakkam (Tirukattupalli/koviladi), Chanda Sahib's son was defeated and later killed by the British.

Following this Chanda Sahib escaped to what was probably his hometown at Tanjore, only to be captured by the "Maratha army of Tanjore". He was beheaded by the Maratha Tanjore Raja named Pratap Singh of Thanjavur.

The English quickly installed Muhammed Ali as the Nawab of Arcot in 1754 and most of Chanda Sahib's native forces defected to the English.

Titles held

See also
 Madurai Nayaks
Marudha Nayakam
Hyder Ali
Robert Clive
Carnatic region
Nawab of Carnatic
Raza Sahib

References

External Articles
Complete information about Nawabs of Arcot
Refer the article named Initial Contacts with the British

Mughal Empire
Nawabs of the Carnatic
History of Puducherry
French India
Medieval India
1752 deaths
Indian Muslims
Year of birth unknown